Leipziger Internet Zeitung (also: l-iz or Lizzy) is a daily online newspaper in the greater Leipzig region of Germany. The newspaper reports on events in various areas, such as politics, economics, culture, education, and sports. In addition, it has built up a large archive on local news in the past years (30.000 articles, 2011). This includes standard news reporting, but also commentary and photo journalism.

References

External links
 Website of the Leipziger Internet Zeitung 

Online publishing companies
Daily newspapers published in Germany
Mass media in Leipzig